Qila Tara Singh is a town and union council of Depalpur Tehsil in the Okara District of Punjab Province, Pakistan. It is located  near Diaram, also a town near Depalpur.

References

Union councils of Okara District